Jovana Kovačević (born 9 April 1996) is a Serbian handball player for Minaur Baia Mare and the Serbian national team.
She previously played for ŽRK Budućnost Podgorica, Békéscsabai Előre NKSE and Érd HC.

Individual awards
Top Scorer of the Romanian League: 2021

References

 

1996 births
Living people
Serbian female handball players
Handball players from Belgrade
Expatriate handball players
Serbian expatriate sportspeople in Hungary
Békéscsabai Előre NKSE players
CS Minaur Baia Mare (women's handball) players
Serbian expatriate sportspeople in Montenegro